1st Nova Scotia general election may refer to:

 Nova Scotia general election, 1758, the 1st general election to take place in the Colony of Nova Scotia, for the 1st General Assembly of Nova Scotia
 1867 Nova Scotia general election, the 23rd overall general election for Nova Scotia, for the (due to a counting error in 1859) 24th Legislative Assembly of Nova Scotia, but considered the 1st general election for the Canadian province of Nova Scotia